Niclosamide, sold under the brand name Niclocide among others, is an anthelmintic medication used to treat tapeworm infestations, including diphyllobothriasis, hymenolepiasis, and taeniasis. It is not effective against other worms such as flukes or roundworms. It is taken by mouth.

Side effects include nausea, vomiting, abdominal pain, and itchiness. It may be used during pregnancy. It works by blocking glucose uptake and oxidative phosphorylation by the worm.

Niclosamide was first synthesized in 1958. It is on the World Health Organization's List of Essential Medicines. Niclosamide is not available for human use in the United States.

Side effects
Side effects include nausea, vomiting, abdominal pain, constipation, and itchiness. Rarely, dizziness, skin rash, drowsiness, perianal itching, or an unpleasant taste occur.  For some of these reasons, praziquantel is a preferable and equally effective treatment for tapeworm infestation.
Important Note: Niclosamide kills the pork tapeworm and results in its digestion. This then may cause a multitude of viable eggs to be released and may result in cysticercosis. Therefore, a purge should be given 1 or two hours after treatment.  CNS cysticercosis is a life-threatening condition and may require brain surgery.

Mechanism of action
Niclosamide inhibits glucose uptake, oxidative phosphorylation, and anaerobic metabolism in the tapeworm.

Other applications
Niclosamide's metabolic effects are relevant to wide ranges of organisms, and accordingly it has been applied as a control measure to organisms other than tapeworms. For example, it is an active ingredient in some formulations such as Bayluscide for killing lamprey larvae, as a molluscide, and as a general purpose piscicide in aquaculture. Niclosamide has a short half-life in water in field conditions; this makes it valuable in ridding commercial fish ponds of unwanted fish; it loses its activity soon enough to permit re-stocking within a few days of eradicating the previous population. Researchers have found that niclosamide is effective in killing invasive zebra mussels in cool waters.

Research
Niclosamide is being studied in a number of types of cancer. Niclosamide along with oxyclozanide, another anti-tapeworm drug, was found in a 2015 study to display "strong in vivo and in vitro activity against methicillin-resistant Staphylococcus aureus (MRSA)".

Various studies have shown that Niclosamide has the potential to counteract various viral infections, at least in experimental conditions. For instance, it has been shown that it impairs the replication of Hepatitis E virus. On July 1, 2020, Danish biotech company UNION started a clinical study using niclosamide in the treatment of COVID-19.

Another study demonstrated the benefit of a combination of Niclosamide and ivermectin against SARS-CoV-2 activity, showing a synergistic profile, suggesting this combination should be further tested in clinical trials.

There is another study that investigated the use of niclosamide as a treatment for COVID-19, showing effectiveness against virus replication and associated cytopathicity.

In 2018, niclosamide was observed to be a potent activator of PTEN-induced kinase 1 in primary cortical neurons. As PINK1 dysfunction is associated with a form of Parkinson's disease, this quality makes niclosamide and derivative compounds attractive as research tools and potential treatment avenues for the condition.

References

External links 
 
 
 
 
 

Anthelmintics
Chloroarenes
Nitrobenzenes
Salicylanilides
World Health Organization essential medicines
Wikipedia medicine articles ready to translate
Pesticides